KUHN (88.9 FM) is a radio station broadcasting a variety format of oldies, adult contemporary, and talk radio related to the Nation. Licensed to Golden Meadow, Louisiana, United States, the station is currently owned by the United Houma Nation.

History
This station was originally applied for by the tribe in October 2007 and was granted in January 2009. However, over the course of time between the issuance of the construction permit and the actual license, the station location, frequency, and power was reduced from 50 kW as was originally proposed at a HAAT of 49 meters and on a frequency of 89.5 Mhz from a location north of Port Fourchon, Louisiana, to the current licensed location at the United Houma Nation's Tribal office south of the city of Golden Meadow, Louisiana, with the antenna on a tower behind the tribe's office. The licensed was granted on September 30, 2011.

References

External links

Native American radio
Radio stations in Louisiana